The flag of El Salvador features a horizontal triband of cobalt blue-white-cobalt blue, with the coat of arms centered and entirely contained within the central white stripe. This design of a triband of blue-white-blue is commonly used among Central American countries. Along with the Dominican Republic, Ecuador and Haiti,  it is one of only four national flags which has a depiction of its flag within the flag itself. El Salvador's flag is one of few that currently use the color purple, and all colors due to the rainbow in its Coat of Arms

Features 

The colors signify:
 
 

The flag has the words (REPÚBLICA DE EL SALVADOR EN LA AMÉRICA CENTRAL) in a bold and Heavy, Sans Serif Boris Black Bloxx typeface, in a golden amber color

The national motto (DIOS UNIÓN LIBERTAD) in Trajan bold Roman square capitals. The letter are colored amber gold on the civil flag, and black in the coat of arms

The date (15 DE SEPTIEMBRE DE 1821) in Trajan bold Roman square capitals

The blue hue is a vivid, lustrous and luscious rich solid cobalt blue. In the center of and occupying the entire width of the white stripe is the coat of arms with its top touching the upper blue strip and its base touching the lower blue stripe. The coat of arms contains the in bold golden amber words "REPÚBLICA DE EL SALVADOR EN LA AMÉRICA CENTRAL". There are two variant flags, one without the coat of arms, and the other with the words "DIOS UNIÓN LIBERTAD" in bold golden amber in place of the coat of arms. All three contain the same cobalt blue and white stripes, occasionally with a gold Fringe (trim). The main flag has an aspect ratio of 189:335 while the variants are both 3:5.

From 1865 to 1912, a different flag was in use, with a field of alternating cobalt blue and white stripes and a red canton containing stars. The designs of both sides of the flag are different; at the reverse side, it shows the then national coat of arms at the position of stars at obverse. The stars symbolized the provinces of the Republic; once a new province was created, one star was add to the obverse of the flag. This "Star-Striped" banner was considered to be inspired by the flag of the United States.

The blue stripes symbolize the ocean and sky. The white means Peace.
Blue is an important color in Salvadoran culture and identity. It started with Native American cultures of Mesoamerica in El Salvador, that produced (añil) indigo plant which they used extracts to produce blue dyes. When the Europeans invaded and colonized the area, they saw the wealth of indigo and turned El Salvador to one of the world's foremost providers of indigo dye in its time.

Many other countries in Central America use blue and white colors as a Pan-Central American symbol.

Synonymous to the country's wealth, the colonizers referred to the dye as "the blue gold", that dominated El Salvador's economy until it was completely replaced by coffee cultivation. Today El Salvador remains as one of the few countries in the world that still cultivates indigo to produce blue dyes. Over time El Salvador's flag has had several different shades of blue, from the lightest to darkest,  including Royal blue, Sapphire, Klein Blue and Indigo. The present current modern flag displays a cobalt blue color.

Departments

Historical flags of El Salvador

Historic Salvadoran flag displays

References 

El Salvador
El Salvador
National symbols of El Salvador